Thapar Institute of Engineering and Technology (TIET), formerly Thapar University, is a deemed-to-be-university, in Patiala, India. It was founded in 1956 by Karam Chand Thapar. The university provides a wide range of courses from The Arts and Humanities, Computer Applications and IT, Animation and Design, Management and Business Administration and Sciences.

Campus 

The campus is housed in a 250-acre land in the heart of Patiala and has six old academic blocks, namely A, B, C, D, E, F and two newly constructed TAN and H block. The old building of Thapar Polytechnic College has been converted into an academic block named G.

Expansion in 2018 
In 2018, the institute inauguration of three new buildings including a lecture hall complex, computer block and a new library.

The completed expansions included the new five-floor Nava Nalanda library, one six-floor computer cpmplex consisting of labs and faculty areas and one six-floor lecture complex with lecture halls of capacity ranging from 200 students to 550 students each and activity rooms with capacity of 200 students each.

The campus includes state of the art hostels namely, A, B, C, D, H, J, K, L, M, O for boys and E, F, G, I, and N for girls with the total capacity exceeding 8,000 students.

Rankings 

Thapar Institute of Engineering and Technology was ranked 601–800 in the world by the Times Higher Education World University Rankings of 2020 and 144 in Asia in the ranking of 2021. The QS World University Rankings of 2022 ranked it 1001–1200 in the world while the in 2020 it was ranked 261–270 in Asia.
In India, the university ranked 23 among engineering colleges by India Today in 2020, and third among private engineering colleges by Outlook India in 2022. The National Institutional Ranking Framework has ranked 29th among engineering institutions in 2020, 31st among universities and 51st overall.

Future expansions 
Thapar University plans to set up two campuses over the next five years: one on a  campus near Chandigarh and another in Chhattisgarh.

Notable alumni
 Anoop Kumar Mittal, chairman and managing director of NBCC Limited
 Aditi Avasthi, CEO and Head of Product of Embibe

References

External links
 

Universities in Punjab, India
Engineering
Punjab
Science and technology in Punjab, India
Patiala
1956 establishments in East Punjab
Educational institutions established in 1956